A. M. Gole is a Professor of Electrical and Computer Engineering at the University of Manitoba, Winnipeg, Canada. Since 1992, he is also the NSERC Industrial Research Chair in Power Systems Simulation.

Early life and education 
He received the B.Tech. degree from the Indian Institute of Technology (Bombay), and M.Sc. and Ph.D. degrees from the University of Manitoba (Winnipeg, Canada), all in Electrical Engineering.

Career 
He is an internationally recognized expert in the field of power systems simulation. Gole's research interests include the utility applications of power electronics and power systems transient simulation. As an original member of the design team, he has made important contributions to the PSCAD/EMTDC simulation program. Gole is active on several working groups of CIGRE and IEEE and is a Registered Professional Engineer in the Province of Manitoba.

In 2007, the IEEE Power Engineering Society awarded Gole the prestigious Nari Hingorani FACTS Award "..for Contributions to the Education in the Field of Power Systems and Embedded Power Electronics Apparatus Simulation". He was elected a Fellow of IEEE in 2010 "for contributions to the modeling of power electronics apparatus."

References

External links
 Dr. Ani Gole - Faculty at U of M

Living people
Academic staff of the University of Manitoba
Year of birth missing (living people)
IIT Bombay alumni
Fellow Members of the IEEE